Batna Province is a province of Algeria, in the region of Aurès. The capital is Batna. Localities in this province include N'Gaous, Merouana and Timgad. Belezma National Park is in the Belezma Range area of the province.

Administrative divisions 
It is made up of 21 districts and 61 municipalities.

The districts are:

 Aïn Djasser
 Aïn Touta
 Arris
 Barika
 Batna
 Bouzina
 Chemora
 Djezzar
 El Madher
 Ichmoul
 Menaâ
 Merouana
 N'Gaous
 Ouled Si Slimane
 Ras El Aioun
 Seggana
 Seriana
 T'Kout
 Tazoult
 Théniet El Abed
 Timgad

The municipalities are:

 Aïn Djasser
 Aïn Touta
 Aïn Yagout
 Amantan
 Amdoukal
 Arris
 N'Gaous
 Batna
 Ben Foudhala El Hakania
 Bitam
 Boulhilat
 Boumagueur
 Boumia
 Bouzina
 Djerma
 Djezzar
 Draa Etine
 El Hassi
 El Madher
 Fesdis
 Foum Toub
 Ghassira
 Chemora
 Gosbat
 Guigba
 Hayat
 Hidoussa
 Ichmoul
 Inoughissen
 Kimmel
 Ksar Bellezma
 Larbaâ
 Lazrou
 Lemsane
 Mâafa
 Menâa
 Merouana
 Metkaouak
 N'Gaous
 Chir
 Oued Chaâba
 Oued El Ma
 Oued Taga
 Ouled Ammar
 Ouled Aouf
 Ouled Fadel
 Ouled Sellam
 Ouled Si Slimane
 Ouyoun El Assafir
 Rahbat
 Ras Ei Aioun
 Sefiane
 Seggana
 Seriana
 Talkhamt
 Taxlent
 Tazoult
 Teniet El Abed
 Tighanimine
 Tigherghar
 Tilatou
 Timgad
 Tkout
 Zana El Beida

Geography 
The origins of the name of the city and province of Batna are not clear, but most historians agree that it is of Arabic origin: m'batna, meaning: "Where we sleep this night". Capital of the highlands situated between the Tell Atlas in the north and the Saharan Atlas in the south, with the Chott el Hodna in the middle, it constitutes a naturally protected passage between south and north. Its climate is moderate, hot and dry during summer time, due to its altitude (it being 800 metres above sea level) the winter is tough, snowy and at times cold (with temperatures of -15 °C recorded on some cold winter nights). This geo-political position is the origin of the last economy merging city due to a high commercial exchange rate between the north's seaward opening, and the south's source of all the wealth of the country (including reserves of oil, natural gas, iron and many minerals).

Population 
Batna City is the fourth largest Algerian city in terms of population; the number of permanent inhabitants is estimated by the Office National de Recencement at 446,000 (as of 2000), though other sources closer to the province estimate closer to one million. A large part of the population is largely mixed from all surrounding villages which suffer from a heavy unemployment rate and isolation. The natives are named "Tamazight", or in the local dialect: "Chaouyas", (the plural of Chaoui). The presence of the Tamazight is historically established; the locals refer to "Jugurtha", "Massinissa" and especially "Dihya" or so called "Kahina", as their ascendants and history. The local resistance to the repetitive invasions is a source of proud and trivial culture; Phoenicians, Romans, Arabs and French. The word "Tamazight" in Chaoui (Berber) language means "Free men". As opposed to the surrounding villages (e.g. Arris, Fesdis, Ain Yagout, Kais, N'gaous, Merouana, Djerma, El Madher, Ouled Nail) where you can find pure chaoui, the city of Batna itself is very heterogeneous, including chaoui from Batna (like Ouled Sidi Yahia, Ouled Boujamâa), Biskra and Khenchla but also many non-berber or mixed families from the Algerian desert (from places such as Oued Souf, Tougourt, Msila and Ouled Jelle) and other places from the west, explaining the fact that the city is mostly arabophone.

Economy 
The economy is based on heavy industry launched during the first half of the 1970s. With chemicals, as well as with an industrial and textile base, the region attracts people from the whole region. The city offers a large choice of university orientation (15,000 students in 2001). The city urban structure is based on the old town buildings, narrow and highly populated; the actual city expansion policy is based on heavy works done the surrounding mountain flanks to provide enough buildable space.

Life level 
The rapid expansion of the city in the last 10 years is mainly due to the open market policy of the previous government, which was a benefit for many, but in the same way penalized many of the middle-class.

The continuously growing city results in an extreme level of inflation especially on the real estate domain where prices reach extreme levels (for example, ownership of one square meter of land in the city center costs $1000) where the lowest paid salaries are in the region of $180.

Social life 
The cultural aspect of the city was active during a time when the local theater group was giving continuous and innovating performances. The city consisted of 12 cinemas and 2 "cinemathèques", one culture house and many open museums across the province. Due to recent events, security problems and an influx of population into the city, the cultural life has been heavily affected, though recently, thanks to the work of young artists, culture is once again on the public scene.

See also

Hodna

References 

 
Provinces of Algeria
States and territories established in 1974